Pierce County is a county in the U.S. state of Wisconsin. As of the 2020 census, the population was 42,212. Its county seat is Ellsworth.

Pierce County is part of the Minneapolis–St. Paul–Bloomington, MN-WI Metropolitan Statistical Area.

History
Native American were the first to live in what became Pierce County, as evidenced in the burial mounds near Diamond Bluff.  Evidence indicates that this area has been inhabited for 10,000 to 12,000 years.  In 1840, St. Croix County covered a large portion of northwest Wisconsin Territory.  In 1853, the Wisconsin State Legislature split St. Croix County into Pierce, Polk, and Saint Croix counties.  Pierce County was named for Franklin Pierce, the fourteenth president of the United States.

Geography

Adjacent counties
St. Croix County – north
Dunn County – northeast
Pepin County – southeast
Goodhue County, Minnesota – south
Dakota County, Minnesota – southwest
Washington County, Minnesota – west

National protected area
 Saint Croix National Scenic Riverway (part)

Demographics

2020 census
As of the census of 2020, the population was 42,212. The racial makeup of the county was 92.3% White, 1.0% Black or African American, 0.7% Asian, 0.5% Native American, 1.1% from other races, and 4.3% from two or more races. Ethnically, the population was 2.9% Hispanic or Latino of any race.

2000 census

As of the census of 2000, there were 36,804 people, 13,015 households, and 9,032 families residing in the county. There were 13,493 housing units at an average density of 23 per square mile (9/km2). The racial makeup of the county was 98.01% White, 0.25% Black or African American, 0.29% Native American, 0.43% Asian, 0.03% Pacific Islander, 0.28% from other races, and 0.72% from two or more races. 0.82% of the population were Hispanic or Latino of any race. 41.0% were of German, 16.2% Norwegian, 7.1% Swedish and 7.1% Irish ancestry.

There were 13,015 households, out of which 35.00% had children under the age of 18 living with them, 58.10% were married couples living together, 7.50% had a female householder with no husband present, and 30.60% were non-families. 21.30% of all households were made up of individuals, and 7.50% had someone living alone who was 65 years of age or older. The average household size was 2.65 and the average family size was 3.10.

In the county, the population was spread out, with 24.40% under the age of 18, 17.00% from 18 to 24, 28.10% from 25 to 44, 20.80% from 45 to 64, and 9.60% who were 65 years of age or older.  The median age was 32 years. For every 100 females there were 97.30 males. For every 100 females age 18 and over, there were 94.20 males.

In 2017, there were 386 births, giving a general fertility rate of 43.7 births per 1000 women aged 15–44, the lowest rate out of all 72 Wisconsin counties.

Communities

Cities
Prescott
River Falls (partly in St. Croix County)

Villages
Bay City
Ellsworth (county seat)
Elmwood
Maiden Rock
Plum City
Spring Valley (partly in St. Croix County)

Towns

Clifton
Diamond Bluff
El Paso
Ellsworth
Gilman
Hartland
Isabelle
Maiden Rock
Martell
Oak Grove
River Falls
Rock Elm
Salem
Spring Lake
Trenton
Trimbelle
Union

Census-designated places
Diamond Bluff
Hager City

Unincorporated communities

Beldenville
El Paso
Esdaile
Exile
Hatchville (partial)
Lawton
Lund
Martell
Moeville
Morton Corner
Nerike
North Red Wing
Oakridge
Olivet
Ono
Ottman Corners
Pucketville
Rock Elm
Salem
Smith Landing
Snows Corner
Trenton
Trimbelle
Viking (partial)
Warrentown
Waverly

Ghost town/neighborhood
Brasington

Transportation

Railroads
BNSF

Buses
List of intercity bus stops in Wisconsin

Politics

See also
National Register of Historic Places listings in Pierce County, Wisconsin
The First Review of Pierce County

References

Further reading
 
 , UWRF ARC F 587 .P6 H5
 , UWRF ARC F 587 .P6 P5 vol. 1.

External links
Pierce County government website
Pierce County map from the Wisconsin Department of Transportation

 
Minneapolis–Saint Paul
Wisconsin counties on the Mississippi River
1853 establishments in Wisconsin
Populated places established in 1853